The Barkleys of Broadway is a 1949 American Technicolor musical comedy film from the Arthur Freed unit at Metro-Goldwyn-Mayer that reunited Fred Astaire and Ginger Rogers after ten years apart. Directed by Charles Walters, the screenplay is by Betty Comden, Adolph Green, and Sidney Sheldon, the songs are by Harry Warren (music) and Ira Gershwin (lyrics) with the addition of "They Can't Take That Away from Me" by George and Ira Gershwin, and the choreography was created by Robert Alton and Hermes Pan. Also featured in the cast were Oscar Levant, Billie Burke, Jacques François and Gale Robbins. It is the last film that Astaire and Rogers made together, and their only film together in color. Rogers came in as a last-minute replacement for Judy Garland, whose frequent absences due to a dependence on prescription medication cost her the role.

Plot
Josh and Dinah Barkley are a husband-and-wife musical comedy team at the peak of their careers. After finishing a new show, Dinah meets serious French playwright Jacques Pierre Barredout (Jacques François), who suggests that Dinah should take up dramatic acting. Dinah tries to keep the suggestion a secret from Josh, but when he finally discovers Dinah hiding a script for Jacques' new show from him, the couple splits up.

Their good friend, acerbic composer Ezra Millar tries to trick them back together again, but fails.  When Josh secretly watches Dinah's rehearsals for Barredout's new play and sees how she is struggling, he calls her up and pretends to be the Frenchman, giving her notes that help her to understand her part, the young Sarah Bernhardt. As the result, Dinah gives a brilliant performance. After the show, she accidentally learns that her late-night mentor was Josh and not Barredout, so she rushes to Josh's apartment and the two reconcile.

Cast

 Fred Astaire as Josh Barkley
 Ginger Rogers as Dinah Barkley
 Oscar Levant as Ezra Millar
 Billie Burke as Mrs Livingston Belney
 Gale Robbins as Shirlene May
 Jacques François as Jacques Pierre Barredout
 Clinton Sundberg as Bert Felsher
 Inez Cooper as Pamela Driscoll
 George Zucco as The Judge
 Hans Conried as Ladislaus Ladi

Cast notes
 MGM borrowed Jacques François from Universal Pictures. Barkleys was his first film in English, and was to be his last American film, although he appeared in two UK-based productions. His French film career was extensive: he worked up until his death in 2003.

Production
The Barkleys of Broadway was conceived under the working title You Made Me Love You, with Judy Garland in the lead role opposite Fred Astaire, a repeat of their pairing in Easter Parade (1948). In fact, producer Arthur Freed had Comden and Green working on the script for the new film even before Easter Parade was finished. The film went into rehearsals with Garland, but it was soon clear that she would not be physically and emotionally able to do it.  Freed contacted Ginger Rogers to see if she was interested in reuniting with Astaire: there had been rumors, denied by both, that the Astaire-Rogers working relationship had not been particularly warm, and they had not worked together since The Story of Vernon and Irene Castle in 1939.  Rogers was interested, and The Barkleys of Broadway became their tenth and final film together, as well as their only film in color.

The production period was from August 8 to October 30, 1948, with some additional work on December 28. While the film was in production, Astaire won an honorary Academy Award for "his unique artistry and his contributions to the technique of musical pictures," presented to him at the awards ceremony by Ginger Rogers.

The Barkleys of Broadway premiered in New York on May 4, 1949, and went into general American release shortly after.

Songs
 "Swing Trot" – music by Harry Warren and lyrics by Ira Gershwin.  Dance critic Arlene Croce called this the best number in the film.  Seen through the opening credits, it was released without visual impediment on That's Entertainment III (1994).
 "Sabre Dance" – by Aram Khachaturian, arranged for piano and orchestra, with Oscar Levant at the piano
 "You'd Be Hard to Replace" – by Harry Warren and Ira Gershwin
 "Bouncin' the Blues" – by Harry Warren
 "My One and Only Highland Fling" – by Harry Warren and Ira Gershwin
 "Weekend in the Country" – by Harry Warren and Ira Gershwin.  Performed by Astaire, Rogers and Oscar Levant.
 "Shoes with Wings On" – by Harry Warren and Ira Gershwin.  Fred Astaire performs this number alone, as part of the show that Josh Barkley does by himself. It utilized compositing to have Astaire, a cobbler, dance with many pairs of shoes.
 Piano Concerto No. 1 (Tchaikovsky) (abridged) – Performed by Oscar Levant with full symphony orchestra.
 "They Can't Take That Away From Me" – by George Gershwin (music) and Ira Gershwin (lyrics).  This song was also used in RKO's 1937 Astaire-Rogers film Shall We Dance, where Astaire had sung it to Rogers (as here).  Their dance duet here (ballroom – no tap), one of their most effective, was the first time they danced it together.
 "Manhattan Downbeat" – by Harry Warren and Ira Gershwin

Three other Harry Warren-Ira Gershwin songs were intended for the film but never used: "The Courtin' of Elmer and Ella," "Natchez on the Mississippi," and "Poetry in Motion." Another song by Warren and Gershwin, "There is No Music", was dropped from the film when Judy Garland was released from the picture.

Response

Critical
Critical response to The Barkleys of Broadway was mixed but positive.

Box Office
According to MGM records the film earned $2,987,000 in the US and Canada and $1,434,000 overseas resulting in a profit of $324,000.

Awards and honors
Although the film did not win any awards, it did receive several nominations.  Cinematographer Harry Stradling Sr. was nominated for a 1950 Academy Award for Best Color Cinematography, and writers Comden and Green were nominated for a Writers Guild of America Award for Best Written American Musical.

Adaptations
A radio version of the film was broadcast on January 1, 1951, as an episode of the Lux Radio Theater, with Ginger Rogers reprising the role of Dinah Barkley, and George Murphy playing her husband and partner Josh.

References

External links

 
 
 
 
 
 ReelClassics.com on Ginger Rogers and Fred Astaire

1949 films
1949 musical comedy films
1940s American films
American musical comedy films
Films directed by Charles Walters
Films produced by Arthur Freed
Films scored by Lennie Hayton
Films with screenplays by Betty Comden and Adolph Green
Metro-Goldwyn-Mayer films